Roger I Armagnac (1190 – 22 March 1245) was Viscount of Fezensaguet. He was the son of Bernard I, Viscount of Fezensaguet and Lomagne, and Geralda de Foix.

Biography
Roger I of Fezensaguet married Pincelle, the Maid of Albret, daughter of Amanieu IV, Lord of Albret, and Asselide Tartas.
Their children were:
 Gerald VI (1235 † 1285), Viscount Fezensaguet, then Count of Armagnac and Fézensac.
 Roger, founder of the branch of the lords and barons of Termes d'Armagnac.
 Arnaud Bernard († 1272), killed in a battle against Gerald Cazaubon.
 Jeanne, married to 1240/42 with Raymond Sancho Manas.

Notes

References
 Achaintre, Nicolas Louis, Histoire généalogique et chronologique de la maison royale de Bourbon, Vol.2, Paris (Rue de l'Ecole de Médecine), 1825
 Revue de Gascogne, Vol. 15, [Auch?]: Imprimerie et Lithographie Felix Foix, 1874.

1190 births
1245 deaths
Viscounts of France